José Martinez de Valdivielso (born José Martinez de Valdivielso López, May 22, 1934) is a Cuban-born former professional baseball player. A shortstop, he appeared in 401 games over all or part of five seasons in Major League Baseball, between 1955 and 1961, for the Washington Senators and their later incarnation, the Minnesota Twins.

In , the team's sixtieth and last season in Washington, Valdivielso was the Senators' most-used shortstop, starting in 92 games and playing a career-high 117 contests. But by late September he had lost his starting job to Zoilo Versalles, a 20-year-old fellow countryman.

Valdivielso's professional career extended through the 1964 season.  All told, he collected 213 hits in the majors, with 26 doubles and eight triples to go along with his nine home runs.

Sources
, or Retrosheet

1934 births
Living people
Charlotte Hornets (baseball) players
Indianapolis Indians players
Louisville Colonels (minor league) players
Lubbock Hubbers players
Major League Baseball players from Cuba
Cuban expatriate baseball players in the United States
Major League Baseball shortstops
Marianao players
Miami Marlins (IL) players
Minneapolis Millers (baseball) players
Minnesota Twins players
Phoenix Giants players
Rock Hill Chiefs players
Vancouver Mounties players
Washington Senators (1901–1960) players
21st-century African-American people